Barlow Bend is an unincorporated community in Clarke County, Alabama, United States. It is the birthplace of Frank Howard, a college football player and head coach of the Clemson Tigers football team from 1940 to 1969. The first church building in Clarke County was built in Barlow Bend in 1819 by John French, a Methodist minister from Virginia. A post office was operated in Barlow Bend from 1877 to 1976.

Media
A historical novel based on actual events, The Woods at Barlow Bend, is set in the area.

References

Unincorporated communities in Alabama
Geography of Clarke County, Alabama